The Icelandic Women's Basketball Cup (Icelandic: Bikarkeppni KKÍ), also known as VÍS bikarinn for sponsorship reasons, is an annual basketball competition between clubs in Iceland. It is Iceland's first-tier cup competition, and is not to be confused with Iceland's former second-tier cup competition, the Company Cup.

History and format
The first edition of the Icelandic Women's Cup championship took place in 1975, and was won by Þór Akureyri. All the rounds are played with a single game knockout format. The final four and the finals are played on a single weekend.

Finally, the winner of the Icelandic Cup championship, or the runner-up if the same team wins both the cup and national championship, will then face the winner of the Úrvalsdeild kvenna championship in a single game to determine the winner of the Icelandic Supercup championship in the beginning of the next season.

The Cup was known as Geysir bikarinn for sponsorship reasons from 2018 to 2020.

Title holders 

 1974–75 Þór Akureyri
 1975–76 KR
 1976–77 KR
 1977–78 ÍS
 1978–79 ÍR
 1979–80 ÍS
 1980–81 ÍS 
 1981–82 KR    
 1982–83 KR  
 1983–84 Haukar  
 1984–85 ÍS  
 1985–86 KR  
 1986–87 KR
 1987–88 Keflavík
 1988–89 Keflavík 
 1989–90 Keflavík 
 1990–91 ÍS 
 1991–92 Haukar 
 1992–93 Keflavík 
 1993–94 Keflavík
 1994–95 Keflavík 
 1995–96 Keflavík
 1996–97 Keflavík 
 1997–98 Keflavík 
 1998–99 KR 
 1999–00 Keflavík
 2000–01 KR
 2001–02 KR 
 2002–03 ÍS 
 2003–04 Keflavík 
 2004–05 Haukar 
 2005–06 ÍS 
 2006–07 Haukar
 2007–08 Grindavík 
 2008–09 KR 
 2009–10 Haukar 
 2010–11 Keflavík 
 2011–12 Njarðvík 
 2012–13 Keflavík 
 2013–14 Haukar 
 2014–15 Grindavík
 2015–16 Snæfell
 2016–17 Keflavík 
 2017–18 Keflavík 
 2018–19 Valur
 2019–20 Skallagrímur
 2020–21 Haukar 
 2021–22 Haukar 
 2022–23 Haukar 

Source

Cup Finals MVP

Source

See also
Icelandic Basketball Federation
Úrvalsdeild kvenna
Icelandic Basketball Supercup
Icelandic Division I

References

External links
 Icelandic Basketball Federation 

1975 establishments in Iceland
Women's basketball cup competitions in Europe
Women's basketball competitions in Iceland
Women
Recurring sporting events established in 1975